Estadio Municipal de Puntarenas Miguel Ángel "Lito" Pérez Treacy is a multi-use stadium in Puntarenas Centro, Puntarenas, Costa Rica. It is nicknamed “La Olla Mágica” ("The Magic Pot") due to the warm weather that is common in the stadium. 

Formerly known as Estadio Municipal de Puntarenas. In 1974, then mayor Lorgio Álvarez proposed to rename the stadium after Puntarenas native football star "Lito" Perez. The motion was approved by the municipal council and the stadium took its new name.

It is currently used mostly for football matches and is the home stadium of Puntarenas F.C., S.A.D and A.D. Municipal Puntarenas F.C.  The stadium holds 4,105 people.

In 2009, Score One Soccer was granted a 10-year contract by Municipalidad de Puntarenas to operate the stadium.

In late 2009 and early 2010, the stadium's locker and press rooms were renovated, field lighting was improved and it is believed to be the best stadium lighting in Central America.

References

External links
(Stadium photo 1)
(Stadium photo 2)
 Official Website of Puntarenas FC
 Municipalidad de Puntarenas

Football venues in Costa Rica
Puntarenas F.C.
Buildings and structures in Puntarenas Province